Dawn Jane Sanders  is a New Zealand theatre scholar, and the founder and current CEO of the Shakespeare's Globe Centre New Zealand.  She received the 2006 Sam Wanamaker Award for her foundation of this centre.

In the 1992 New Year Honours, Sanders was awarded the Queen's Service Medal for community service. In the 2013 Queen's Birthday Honours, she was appointed an Officer of the New Zealand Order of Merit, for services to theatre.

References

External links
Shakespeare's Globe Centre New Zealand

Living people
New Zealand academics
Recipients of the Queen's Service Medal
Officers of the New Zealand Order of Merit
Year of birth missing (living people)

New Zealand theatre people